Brenda Zara Seligman ( Salaman; 26 June 1883 – 2 January 1965) was a British anthropologist who was the winner of the Rivers Memorial Medal in 1933 for five years of fieldwork. She was married to Charles Seligman who has overshadowed her contribution. He died in 1940 and she continued to extend their private museum collections. She rose to be vice-president of the Royal Anthropological Institute and to leave vast collections to leading British museums.

Life

Seligman was born in London in 1883. She was educated at home before attending Roedean and then she took pre-medical studies at Bedford College.

She was involved with anthropology as she help write up Charles Seligman's notes on his visit to New Guinea after he married her in 1905. The British government was commissioning ethnographic surveys and the two of them undertook the work initially in Sri Lanka in 1907/8 studying aboriginal culture there. They published this work as "The Veddas" under joint authorship in 1911. In 1909 they were undertaking anthropological work in Sudan and archaeological work in Egypt. They returned to Sudan in 1911/12 and 1921/22 where Brenda learnt Arabic.  They returned to Egypt in 1913/14.

She would sort out genealogies and wider relationships including particularly women and children where she could gain access denied to men. She and Charles took a joint interest in the psychology, magic and beliefs and she left the study of less abstract aspects to Charles.

She was the winner of Rivers Memorial Medal in 1933 for her work over five years in the field. Her husband had won the medal a few years before. Charles Seligman who overshadowed her contribution even though their books were issued under both their names.

In 1932 they published Pagan Tribes of the Nilotic Sudan which documented their work together.

Seligman died in Kensington. Her and her husband's papers are held at the London School of Economics.

Works include
The Veddas, 1911
Pagan Tribes of the Nilotic Sudan, 1932

References

1883 births
1965 deaths
Scientists from London
Ethnologists